Chan-woo is a Korean masculine given name.

People with this name include:
 Jung Chan-woo (comedian) (born 1968), South Korean comedian
 Jung Chan-woo (singer) (born 1998), South Korean singer, member of iKON

See also
List of Korean given names

References

Korean masculine given names